Sphaerium asiaticum is a species of bivalve belonging to the family Sphaeriidae.

Per IUCN, the species has the status "least concern".

References

asiaticum